Mie Honda Heat is a Japanese rugby union team based in Suzuka City, Mie Prefecture, Japan. The owner of the club is Honda Motor. (Suzuka is known for the Suzuka Circuit and the presence of car companies.)

They play in the Japan Rugby League One, the top tier of the Japan's rugby union hierarchy.

In 2011–12, Honda Heat were relegated to regional events for 2012–13. Winning 2 and drawing 1 of their 13 games in the regular season.

The team rebranded as Mie Honda Heat ahead of the rebranding of the Top League as the Japan Rugby League One in 2022.

History
Honda Motor Co. established its rugby club in 1960 at the Suzuka Factory. The team gained promotion to the Kansai A-League for the 1978 season, and then finished sixth in the seven-team competition in for that year. Honda remained a fixture in the Kansai A-League, being demoted only once (for the 1985 season) before it was renamed the Top West A-League in 2003-04 with the introduction of Japan's Top League.

Honda did not qualify for inclusion in the Top League for inaugural season—that had to wait for another six years—but the team continued to play in the Top West A-League. After winning the league in 2008-09 under New Zealander John Sherratt, Honda Heat was promoted. The team played one Top League season in 2009–10 before being demoted and another in 2011–12 before being demoted again to Top West A, where they remained for three seasons.

Honda won the Top West A-League in 2014–15, and was promoted once again for the 2015–16 season of Top League, finishing at 11th place. So the team stayed for another term, this time ending the tournament at place 16th of 16 and being relegated to the newly introduced second-tier Top Challenge League.

The season 2017–18 was played as a round-robin tournament, the Heats managing to win and become promoted automatically for the 2018–19 Top League season, back to first tier status.

Current squad

The current Mie Honda Heat squad for the 2023 season is:

Coaches
  John Sherratt: April 2008 – March 2010
  Danny Lee: May 2017 - May 2021
  Taihei Ueda: June 2021 – present

See also
Top League Challenge Series

References

External links
Honda Heat Rugby - official site
Honda Heat Stats - Rugbyarchive.net

Rugby clubs established in 1960
Sports teams in Mie Prefecture
Heat
1960 establishments in Japan
Japan Rugby League One teams